The Great West Conference baseball tournament, sometimes referred to simply as the Great West tournament, was the conference baseball championship of the NCAA Division I Great West Conference.  The eight members of the league played in the double-elimination tournament, which in its final season (2013) was played at Bears & Eagles Riverfront Stadium in Newark, New Jersey. Because of the league's provisional status in Division I, the winner of the tournament did not receive an automatic berth to the NCAA Division I Baseball Championship.

Champions

By year
The following is a list of conference champions and sites listed by year.

By school
The following is a list of conference champions listed by school.

References

 
Recurring sporting events established in 2010
Recurring events disestablished in 2013